, is a Japanese voice actress from Kanagawa Prefecture who is attached to Haikyo.

Voice Roles
Bold denotes leading roles.

TV Animation
ef: A Tale of Melodies. as Miyako Miyamura
ef: A Tale of Memories. as Miyako Miyamura
Fortune Arterial: Akai Yakusoku as Haruna Yuuki
Hamtaro as Nijiham-kun (Prince Bo)
Kyo Kara Maoh as Gisela
Lamune as Sakura Hiromi
Steam Detectives as Ling Ling
The Fruit of Grisaia as Amane Suou
The Eden of Grisaia as Amane Suou
Le Labyrinthe de la Grisaia as Amane Suou
Yosuga no Sora as Sora Kasugano

OVA
Aki Sora: Yume no Naka as Aki Aoi
Ayumayu Gekijou as Kagami Sumika
Beat Angel Escalayer as Sayuka Kōenji
Moonlight Lady as Suzuna Kuraki (ep 5)

Internet Animation
Ayumayu Gekijou as Kagami Sumika

Games
Crayanne, Naive Woman, Energetic Girl (God Catching Alchemy Meister)
Hermione (Azur Lane)
Hinata Natsumi (Sharin no Kuni, Himawari no Shōjo)
Kagami Sumika (Muv-Luv)
Kagami Sumika (Muv-Luv Supplement)
Kagami Sumika, 00 Unit (Muv-Luv Alternative)
Kagami Sumika (All-age Muv-Luv)
Kagami Sumika, 00 Unit (All-age Muv-Luv Alternative)
Kamuchataaru (Utawarerumono Chiriyukumonotachi he no Komoriuta)
Koyuki (¥120 Stories)
Masamune Shizuru (Noble☆Works)
Mitamura Akane (Kono Aozora ni Yakusoku wo-)
Miyamura Miyako (Ef: The First Tale.)
Miyamura Miyako (Ef: First Fan Disc)
Monica Raybrant (Dark Chronicle)
Nagisa Suzushiro (fortissimo EXA//Akkord:Bsusvier)
Natsumi (¥120 Stories)
Onomiya Yutsuki (Mashiroiro Symphony) 
Sakura Hiromi (Ramune)
Sakura Hiromi (Ramune 〜Garasubin ni Utsuru Umi〜)
Sakurano Yuu (Haru no Ashioto)
Sakurano Yuu (Haru no Ashioto -step of spring-)
Sakurano Yuu (Sakura no Saku Koro)
Sora Kasugano (Yosuga no Sora)
Sora Kasugano (Haruka na Sora)
Suou Amane (Grisaia no Kajitsu)
Sakurajousui Kurumi (Ijiwaru My Master)
Yarai Miu (Dracu-riot!)
Zofia (The Alchemist Code)
Hermione (Azur Lane)

References

1954 births
Living people
Japanese voice actresses
Voice actresses from Kanagawa Prefecture
Tokyo Actor's Consumer's Cooperative Society voice actors